Megamind: Ultimate Showdown (also known as Megamind: The Blue Defender on PSP and DS) is a 3D platformer video game based on the Megamind franchise, developed by THQ Studio Australia for console and Tantalus for handheld, published by THQ in association with DreamWorks Animation. It was released on November 2, 2010 for Xbox 360 and PlayStation 3, to coincide with the film's release. It was critically panned for its story and gameplay, as well as its low level of difficulty.

Gameplay
The player has the ability to play as Megamind by using his De-Gun to vaporize enemies. For the console version, the game contains hidden loot and upgrades acquired by various amounts of B.I.N.K.E.Y. (Blue Ion Nano-Kinetic Energ-Y) If there is a second player, the player can play as a Brainbot that assists Megamind. For the handheld version, players get to level up their weapons and collect ammo from defeated enemies.

While most of the original film's cast were replaced with stand-in voice actors, Jonah Hill reprises his role as Hal Stewart / Titan.

Plot
After Megamind becomes the hero of Metro City, Minion tells him that a group of villains known as the Doom Syndicate took Metro Man and Megamind's DNA. Megamind must defeat them and save Metro City. He first investigates the city streets, taking down the Destruction Worker, then defeating Psycho Delic in the sewers, and finally Hot Flash downtown. Collecting the parts for his DNA tracker, Megamind confronts Titan, his power restored and infused with Megamind's intelligence. Megamind still manages to defeat him at City Hall by collapsing parts of the building on him, weakening him enough for Megamind to use a serum to revert Hal back to normal. Megamind is victorious.

Reception 

The game received an aggregate score on Metacritic of 43/100 on PlayStation 3 and 33/100 on Xbox 360, indicating "generally unfavorable reviews".

Official Xbox Magazine rated the Xbox 360 version of the game 3/10, calling the graphics the only part of the game that were not bad. Computer and Video Games rated the same version 1.8/10, calling the main game "exhausting inanity" and "the latest in a long line of identikit THQ kiddy platformers". Adam Wolfe of PlayStation LifeStyle rated the PS3 version 4/10, calling it a decent platformer but criticizing the gameplay as "repetitive" and the story "lackluster".

References

External links 
 
 

2010 video games
Ultimate Showdown
Video games based on films
Multiplayer and single-player video games
PlayStation 3 games
Video games developed in Australia
Xbox 360 games
Tantalus Media games
THQ games